Carmichaels Area Junior/Senior High School is a public Junior/Senior High School, serving around 400 students in grades 6-12, and is located about 60 miles south of Pittsburgh in eastcentral Greene County.

Alma Mater
The Alma Mater for Carmichaels  was written and composed by Arnold Battaglini

Dear old Carmichaels a toast to you,
Carmichaels, our Alma Mater.
In our hearts we’ll ever think of you,
We are loyal sons and daughters.
Dear golden years passing by,
Oh, how they fly!
Short years for both you and I,
We will always sing this song to you,
To the world we’ll tell your story.
We are proud that we belong to you,
As you stand in all your glory.

Graduation Requirements
The Carmichaels Area School District requires students to attain a minimum of 25 Planned Courses through successful completion of coursework.
 English - 4 Planned Courses
 Math - 4 Planned Courses
 Science - 4 Planned Courses
 History - 4 Planned Courses
 Phys. Ed. - 1 Planned Course
 Electives - 8 Courses

Career Paths
Students at Carmichaels have the option in grades 10-12 to choose one of two career paths:
 Academic - Students plan to further their education after High School by completing the required coursework for institutions of higher learning.
 Tech-Prep - Students spend one-half of the school day at Carmichaels and the other one-half at the Greene County Career and Technology Center in Franklin Township, near Waynesburg.

Challenge Program
The Challenge Program, Inc. offers $250.00 cash incentives to Carmichaels Area Junior Senior High School students who excel in the categories of: Academic Improvement, Attendance, Community Service and Academic Excellence. The program partners with businesses to motivate students both in and out of the classroom by encouraging good habits in students that will last throughout their education and into their future careers. For the 2010–2011 school year, the top 10% of students in each of the categories will be eligible to win $250.00.

Athletics
Carm Area participates in the Western Pennsylvania Interscholastic Athletic League, or WPIAL, which is PIAA  District 7.
 Baseball - Class AA
 Basketball - Class AA
 Football - Class A
 Golf - Class AAAA
 Softball - Class A
 Volleyball - Class AA

Junior High Athletics
Seventh and Eighth graders participate  in the following non-classified sports:
 Basketball
 Football
 Softball
 Volleyball

References

Public high schools in Pennsylvania
Public middle schools in Pennsylvania
Schools in Greene County, Pennsylvania